Zarak is a 1956 British film. Other meanings of Zarak include:

Lord Zarak is the binary-bonded partner of the arachnid Scorponok, a Transformers character
Zarak the arachnid DemonLord from Weaponlord
Zarak, Afghanistan, a small village in Afghanistan
Zarak, Iran, a village in Chaharmahal and Bakhtiari Province, Iran
Zarak, Fars, a village in Fars Province, Iran
Zarak-e Tang Khas, a village in Fars Province, Iran

See also
Zarek (disambiguation)